Dornsife is a populated place in Little Mahanoy Township, Northumberland County, Pennsylvania, United States, with a ZIP code of 17823. As of the 2010 U.S. Census, the ZIP Code Tabulation Area had a population of 1,273, with a median age of 41.9.

References

Unincorporated communities in Northumberland County, Pennsylvania
Unincorporated communities in Pennsylvania